A lighter is a hand-held device for creating a flame.

Lighter can also be:
 Lighter (barge), a type of flat-bottomed barge used to transfer goods to and from moored ships
 Lightering, also called "lighterage", the process of transferring cargo between vessels of different sizes

Songs
 "Lighter" (Nathan Dawe song), a 2020 song featuring KSI and uncredited vocals from Ella Henderson
 "Lighter", a 2015 song by Miley Cyrus song from her album Miley Cyrus & Her Dead Petz
 "Lighters" (song), a 2011 song by Bad Meets Evil featuring Bruno Mars
"Lighter", a song by Miss Kittin from Radio Caroline Vol.1
"Lighters (The One)", a 2013 song by Gabz

See also
 Light
 Liter
 Weight